Tomb KV16 is located in the Valley of the Kings in Egypt. It was used for the burial of Pharaoh Ramesses I of the Nineteenth Dynasty. The burial place was discovered by Giovanni Belzoni in October 1817.

As Ramesses I ruled for less than two years, his sepulchre is rather truncated, being only twenty-nine metres long. It consists of two descending staircases, linking a sloping corridor and leading to the burial chamber. Like the tomb  of Horemheb (KV57), the grave is decorated with the Book of Gates. The sarcophagus, still in place in the final chamber, is constructed of red quartzite.

References
Reeves, N & Wilkinson, R.H. The Complete Valley of the Kings, 1996, Thames and Hudson, London.
Siliotti, A. Guide to the Valley of the Kings and to the Theban Necropolises and Temples, 1996, A.A. Gaddis, Cairo.

Gallery

External links

Theban Mapping Project: KV16 - Includes description, images, and plans of the tomb.

1817 archaeological discoveries
Buildings and structures completed in the 13th century BC
Valley of the Kings
Ramesses I